Williams Middle School may refer to:

 Williams Middle School (Moultrie, Georgia)
 Williams Middle School (Longmeadow, Massachusetts)
 David E. Williams Middle School (Kennedy Township, Pennsylvania)
 Williams Middle School (Florence, South Carolina)
 Williams Middle School (Sturgis, South Dakota)

See also
 Williams High School (disambiguation)